The following lists events that happened during 1833 in Australia.

Events
5 January – The Perth Gazette and the West Australian Journal are first published by Charles Macfaull
23 January –  Bathurst is gazetted as a town
1 May – Yagan and Midgegoroo are proclaimed as outlaws for killing two whites at Canning; Yagan is killed in July
23 October – The town of Mussel Brook (later Muswellbrook) is proclaimed

Births

 9 March – William Henry Groom, Queensland politician and newspaper proprietor (born in the United Kingdom) (d. 1901)
 29 May – George Gordon McCrae, poet (born in the United Kingdom) (d. 1927)
 10 August – Edward Devine, coach driver, hotelier and barman (d. 1908)
 15 October – John Alexander MacPherson, 7th Premier of Victoria (d. 1894)
 19 October – Adam Lindsay Gordon, South Australian politician and poet (born in the United Kingdom) (d. 1870)
 18 November – Sir James Patterson, 17th Premier of Victoria (born in the United Kingdom) (d. 1895)

Deaths

 13 March – William Bradley, naval officer and cartographer (born in the United Kingdom and died in France) (b. 1758)
 7 May – Watkin Tench, naval officer and author (born and died in the United Kingdom) (b. 1758)
 17 July – William Redfern, surgeon (born in Ireland and died in the United Kingdom) (b. 1774)
 27 September – John Palmer, administrator (born in the United Kingdom) (b. 1760)
 11 November – James Grant, naval officer and navigator (born in the United Kingdom and died in France) (b. 1772)
 17 November – Alexander Riley, merchant and pastoralist (born and died in the United Kingdom) (b. 1778)

References

 
Australia
Years of the 19th century in Australia